Jack Leggett (born March 5, 1954) is a retired American head college baseball coach. He was recently the head coach of the Clemson Tigers from 1994 to 2015.  Under Leggett, the Tigers reached the College World Series six times.  As of the end of the 2012 season, he had a career record of 1,224–694–1, with seven conference tournament titles and 23 NCAA Tournament appearances.

He was named Atlantic Coast Conference Baseball Coach of the year in 1994, 1995 and 2006.  In 1994, his team won 57 games, a record for the second most single-season wins in ACC history (behind the record 60 wins set by the 1991 Clemson team).

Coaching career
Leggett served as head coach for five years at Vermont and nine years at Western Carolina.  He became the head coach at Vermont prior to the 1978 season.  After coaching the Vermont club baseball team in 1977, Leggett had brought the program back to varsity status, after it had been cut following the 1971 season.  He set a program record for wins (22) in 1981, and Vermont appeared in consecutive ECAC New England Division I Tournaments in 1981 and 1982. In 1981, Leggett managed the Falmouth Commodores, a collegiate summer baseball team in the prestigious Cape Cod Baseball League.

At Western Carolina, he had 302 career wins and led the Catamounts to five NCAA Tournaments (1985–89), and five Southern Conference titles. Under his guidance, the Catamounts averaged 33 wins a season during his time in Cullowhee, N.C. He is the only person to be the head coach at both NCAA Division I schools nicknamed the Catamounts (Vermont and Western Carolina).

Leggett was inducted into the Western Carolina University Athletic Hall of Fame in 2001  and the Vermont Principals Association Hall of Fame in 2009.  In 2014, Leggett will be inducted into the American Baseball Coaches Association Hall of Fame. Leggett was a member of the 2015 class of the Vermont Sports Hall of Fame.

The son of former University of Vermont swim coach Les Leggett, he grew up in South Burlington, Vermont and was a three-sport athlete at South Burlington High School, winning state titles in baseball and football.  He attended the University of Maine  where he earned all-conference honors in both football (defensive back, kicker) and baseball (infielder), captaining the Black Bears in 1976 when they advanced to the College World Series.  In football, he holds the Maine record for longest field goal, a 52-yarder.

Head coaching record

See also
 List of college baseball coaches with 1,100 wins
 List of current NCAA Division I baseball coaches

References

External links
 
 Vermont Sports Hall of Fame profile

1954 births
Living people
Cape Cod Baseball League coaches
Clemson Tigers baseball coaches
Maine Black Bears baseball players
Maine Black Bears football players
People from South Burlington, Vermont
Vermont Catamounts baseball coaches
Western Carolina Catamounts baseball coaches
Baseball players from Vermont
Sportspeople from Bangor, Maine
Baseball coaches from Vermont
Players of American football from Vermont